The courts of quarter sessions or quarter sessions were local courts traditionally held at four set times each year in the Kingdom of England from 1388 (extending also to Wales following the Laws in Wales Act 1535). They were also established in Scotland, Ireland and in various other dominions of the British Empire.

Quarter sessions generally sat in the seat of each county and county borough, and in numerous non-county boroughs (mainly, but not exclusively, ancient boroughs), which were entitled to hold their own quarter sessions (see below), although some of the smaller boroughs lost their own quarter sessions in 1951 (see below). All quarter sessions were abolished in England and Wales in 1972, when the Courts Act 1971 replaced them and the assizes with a single permanent Crown Court. In Scotland, they survived until 1975, when they were abolished and replaced by district courts and later by justice of the peace courts.

The quarter sessions were named after the quarter days on which they met in England and Wales from 1388. These days were later settled as Epiphany, Easter, Midsummer, and Michaelmas sessions.

Reputation

Bentley notes in English Criminal Justice in the Nineteenth Century that "the reputation of such courts remained consistently bad throughout the century" due to failure by chairmen to take proper note of evidence, display of open bias against prisoners, and the severity of sentences compared to the assizes. Chairmen of county sessions did not have to be legally qualified.

Jurisdiction

The quarter sessions generally heard crimes that could not be tried summarily by the justices of the peace without a jury in petty sessions, which were sent up by the process of indictment to be heard in quarter sessions.

The quarter sessions did not have jurisdiction to hear the most serious crimes, most notably those subject to capital punishment or later life imprisonment. These crimes were sent for trial at the periodic assizes.

Staff

The quarter sessions in each county were made up of two or more justices of the peace, presided over by a chairman, who sat with a jury. County boroughs and other boroughs entitled to their own quarter sessions had a single recorder instead of a bench of justices.

Every court of quarter sessions had a clerk called the clerk of the peace. For county quarter sessions, this person was appointed by the custos rotulorum of the county – the justice of the peace for the county charged with custody of its rolls and records. There was a large fee income for the clerk, and he was usually a friend or relative of the custos. The clerk rarely discharged the duties of the office himself, but appointed a solicitor to act as his deputy in return for a share of the fees. After 1852, payment by salary was gradually brought in instead of fees.

In some counties there were multiple quarter sessions, quite apart from those held by the county boroughs and boroughs with their own quarter sessions: for example, Yorkshire had its North Riding, West Riding, and East Riding; whilst Northamptonshire's Soke of Peterborough was administered separately.  These divisions were carried on to the administrative counties that county councils covered.

Civil jurisdiction

The courts of quarter sessions, throughout, had a narrow civil jurisdiction, however until the Local Government Act 1888 created elected county councils, also provided or authorised much major infrastructure and services that needed to span more than one vestry for their respective counties.

Most of such powers were delegated to committees, given specific responsibilities, of members – magistrates.  Most of these administrative functions were transferred to county councils when they were established in 1888.

These functions and powers included:

Supervision of how the vestries (of each poor law parish) were administering the English Poor Laws before 1834
Repair of roads and bridges (and appointment of county surveyors)
Highway diversions and closure (stopping up of rights of way)
Construction and maintenance of county buildings
Administration of the county gaol(s) (jails)
Supervision of public and private lunatic asylums
Supervision and organisation of petty sessions  (more local sittings of the magistrates themselves)
Licensing of public houses
The county militia, particularly per the 1802 to contribute to an Old Militia to number, that year, 51,489 men in England and Wales and at times a "Supplementary Militia" of half as many again which could be raised with Parliamentary approval.
The police
Managing their finances mainly by setting county rates (see Rates in the United Kingdom), also borrowing and repaying when and how the law permitted such as against the security of a toll bridge.

Non-county boroughs which held their own quarter sessions
The non-county boroughs of then-fewer than 20,000 residents were replaced were by the Magistrates' courts committees, on 1 October 1951.

Berwick-upon-Tweed
Bideford
Bridgnorth
Carmarthen
Chichester
Faversham
Haverfordwest
Hythe
Ludlow
Maldon
Oswestry
Richmond
Liberty of Ripon
Rye
Saffron Walden
Sandwich
South Molton
Stamford
Sudbury
Tenterden
Thetford
Tiverton
Warwick
Wenlock

Yet that Act created a separate quarter sessions for the Isle of Wight.

The more populous non-county boroughs continued to hold their own quarter sessions until they were abolished in 1972 by the Courts Act 1971.

Abingdon
Andover
Banbury
Barnstaple
Bedford
Bridgwater
Cambridge
Carlisle
Bury St. Edmunds
Colchester
Deal
Devizes
Dover
Folkestone
Grantham
Gravesend
Guildford
Hereford
King's Lynn
Lichfield
Maidstone
Margate
Newark
Newbury
Newcastle-under-Lyme
Penzance
Pontefract
Poole
Rochester
Salisbury
Scarborough
Shrewsbury
Swindon
Winchester
Windsor (officially New Windsor)

Scotland
Quarter sessions were established in Scotland by an Act of the Parliament of Scotland in 1661 (cap. 38), which directed justices of the peace to meet together in each county on the first Tuesday of March, May and August, and the last Tuesday of October. Often quarter sessions were delayed, in which case they met as general sessions. Quarter sessions were abolished alongside other local courts by the District Courts (Scotland) Act 1975, which moved justices of the peace to sit in a uniform series of district courts, since replaced by justice of the peace courts.

Quarter session courts in Ireland

There were quarter sessions courts for each county and county of a city or town as well as the boroughs of Derry, Kinsale, and Youghal. The recorder of the court sat alone. In Dublin city, which had no assizes, the quarter sessions court had cognizance of all crimes committed within the city's boundaries except treason. The Municipal Corporations (Ireland) Act 1840 abolished many city and borough courts, but Dublin, Cork, Galway and Carrickfergus retained their courts of quarter sessions.

In 1867, the Attorney-General for Ireland, Hedges Eyre Chatterton, issued guidelines to regulate which cases ought to be tried at assizes rather than quarter sessions: treason, murder, treason felony, rape, perjury, assault with intent to murder, party processions, election riots, and all offences of a political or insurrectionary character.

Quarter Sessions were abolished in the Irish Free State under the Courts of Justice Act 1924. Their jurisdiction (together with that of the assizes and the county courts) was largely transferred to the Circuit Court.

Courts of quarter sessions of the peace of Lower Canada

The courts of quarter sessions of the peace was created in August 1764 and headed by a chairman in each district. In Montreal, the Governor of Montreal was replaced with the Court of Quarter Sessions Chairman.

List of quarter session courts in Lower Canada from 1763 to 1790:

 Montreal District
 Quebec District
 Trois-Rivières District

In 1791 27 districts were created to replace the role of the three founding districts. In 1832 when Montreal was incorporated as a city the role of the Mayor of Montreal replaced the quarter sessions chairman and that of the court by Montreal City Council.

Courts of quarter sessions in Upper Canada

A Court of Quarter Sessions was held four times a year in each district to oversee the administration of the district and deal with legal cases in the Province of Upper Canada (later Province of Canada West after 1841). It was created in 1788 and remained in effect until 1849 when local governments and courts were assigned to county governments to replace the district system created in the 1780s.

List of Quarter Session courts in Upper Canada and later in Canada West:

 Lunenburgh District 1788–1792 – sat at New Johnstown (present-day Cornwall, Ontario)
 Eastern District, Upper Canada 1792–1849
 Johnstown District, Upper Canada 1798–1849 – carved out from Eastern District
 Bathurst District 1822–1849 – carved out from Johnstown District
 Dalhousie District 1838–1849
 Mecklenburg District 1788–1792 – sat at Kingston (now Kingston, Ontario)
 Midland District, Upper Canada 1792–1849
 Prince Edward District, Upper Canada 1831
 Victoria District, Upper Canada 1837
 Nassau District 1788–1792 – sat at Newark (Niagara-on-the-Lake) and later at York, Upper Canada (later Toronto)
 Home District 1792–1849
 Niagara District 1798–1849
 Gore District, Upper Canada 1816–1849
 Wellington District 1838–1849
Simcoe District, Upper Canada 1837
 Hesse District 1788–1792 – sat at Sandwich (now Windsor, Ontario)
 Western District, Upper Canada 1792–1849
 London District, Upper Canada 1798–1849
 Brock District, Upper Canada and Talbot District, Upper Canada 1837–1849
 Huron District, Upper Canada 1838–1849

Court of Quarter Sessions in pre-Confederation Canada

 Court of Quarter Sessions for the Middle Division, Nova Scotia

United States 

Courts of quarter sessions also existed in North American colonies and were sometimes known as courts of general sessions. When the United States became an independent country, the Courts of General Sessions became independent of those Britain and were gradually replaced by other court systems, although the name "Court of Quarter Sessions" or "quarterly court" was retained for some county legislative bodies in some jurisdictions.

In Pennsylvania, the courts of general sessions continued until the constitution of that Commonwealth was rewritten in 1968 and the courts' jurisdiction was placed under the pre-existing courts of common pleas in each county.

In New York, the Court of Quarter Sessions was established in October 17, 1683, by the first Assembly in New York. It had jurisdiction over both civil and criminal matters until 1691, when it was restricted to felony crimes not punishable by death or life imprisonment. The court was abolished in all counties of New York except New York County (now Manhattan). In New York County, the Court of General Sessions continued until 1962 when its scope devolved to the New York Supreme Court (a trial-level court of general jurisdiction not to be confused with the highest court of the New York system, which is called the New York Court of Appeals). At the time when it was abolished, the Court of General Sessions of New York County was the oldest criminal court in the United States.

In the Northwest Territory, Governor Arthur St. Clair modeled county government on that of Pennsylvania. In each county, a court of quarter sessions of the peace, composed of three or more justices of the peace, served as the administrative and fiscal board of the county. In 1804, after Ohio became a state, the courts of quarter sessions of the peace were replaced by boards of county commissioners.

Australia

Quarter Sessions were also held in the colony of New South Wales.

India and Malaysia
In India, Bangladesh and Malaysia, the quarter sessions have evolved into permanent Sessions Courts.

See also
Courts of England and Wales

References

Bibliography
 

Former courts and tribunals in England and Wales
Judiciary of Canada
1388 establishments in England
Courts and tribunals established in 1388
1972 disestablishments in England
Courts and tribunals disestablished in 1972